The Men's Downhill competition of the Sapporo 1972 Olympics was held at Mount Eniwa on Monday, February 7.

The defending world champion was Bernhard Russi of Switzerland, who was also the defending World Cup downhill champion, and Austria's Karl Schranz led the current season. Schranz was classified as a professional and banned from the Olympics.

Russi won the gold medal, teammate Roland Collombin took the silver, and Heini Messner of Austria won the bronze.

Results

References

External links
 YouTube.com - 1972 Winter Olympics - Men's Downhill - Gold and Bronze medalists' runs - from Japanese television
 FIS results

1972
Men's alpine skiing at the 1972 Winter Olympics
Winter Olympics
Men's downhill